Anders Nørgaard is a Danish designer. He graduated from The Royal Danish Academy of Fine Arts in 1989. In 1994 he established the company Nørgaard Design in Aarhus, Denmark.

Selected works 
 One chair 
 Freistil 162 
 Luna

References 

Year of birth missing (living people)
Living people
Danish designers